Private August Frederick Bronner (1835 – October 31, 1893) was a German soldier who fought in the American Civil War. Bronner received the United States' highest award for bravery during combat, the Medal of Honor, for his action during the Battle of White Oak Swamp in Virginia and the Battle of Malvern Hill also in Virginia on June 30 and July 1, 1862.

Biography
Bronner was born in Germany around 1835. He died on 31 October 1893. His remains are interred at the Fairmount Cemetery, Newark.

Medal of Honor citation

See also

List of American Civil War Medal of Honor recipients: A–F

References

1835 births
1893 deaths
German-born Medal of Honor recipients
German emigrants to the United States
People of New York (state) in the American Civil War
Union Army officers
United States Army Medal of Honor recipients
American Civil War recipients of the Medal of Honor